Leçons de Ténèbres may refer to:
 Leçons de ténèbres - a genre of French baroque music
 Leçons de ténèbres (Couperin) - music in this genre by François Couperin
 Leçons de Ténèbres (album) - an album by Elend (band)